Gölyurt is a village in the Gerger District, Adıyaman Province, Turkey. The village is populated by Kurds of the Barmaz tribe and had a population of 1,315 in 2021.

The hamlets of Akçiçek, Ayrancı, Elmalı, Görgülü, Karadut, Kocani, Korucak, Otluca and Sazlık are attached to Gölyurt.

References

Villages in Gerger District

Kurdish settlements in Adıyaman Province